Pentila pauli, the Paul's buff, Paul's pentila or spotted pentila, is a butterfly in the family Lycaenidae. It is found in Senegal, Guinea, Sierra Leone, Liberia, Ivory Coast, Ghana, Togo, Benin, Nigeria, Cameroon, Gabon, the Republic of the Congo, the Central African Republic, Sudan, the Democratic Republic of the Congo, Angola, Uganda, Ethiopia, Kenya, Tanzania, Zambia, Malawi and Zimbabwe. The habitat consists of deciduous woodland and forest margins.

The larvae feed on very dark, blue-green (black) algae (cyanobacteria) growing on tree trunks.

Subspecies
P. p. pauli (Sierra Leone, Liberia, Ivory Coast, Ghana, Togo, Benin, Nigeria, western Cameroon)
P. p. abri  Collins & Larsen, 2001 (south-eastern Senegal, western Guinea)
P. p. alberta  Hulstaert, 1924 (western Tanzania, Democratic Republic of the Congo: Tanganika)
P. p. benguellana  Stempffer & Bennett, 1961 (Angola: Benguella and Bihe districts)
P. p. clarensis  Neave, 1903 (Uganda, western Kenya, Tanzania)
P. p. dama  (Suffert, 1904) (southern coast of Tanzania)
P. p. elisabetha  Hulstaert, 1924 (northern and western Zambia, Democratic Republic of the Congo: Shaba, Sankuru, Kasai and Maniema)
P. p. leopardina  Schultze, 1923 (southern Cameroon, Gabon, Congo, Central African Republic, Democratic Republic of the Congo: Cataractes, Kinshasa, Equateur, Tshuapa and Mongala)
P. p. multiplagata  Bethune-Baker, 1908 (southern Sudan, Democratic Republic of the Congo: Uele, Ituri, Tshopo and North Kivu)
P. p. nyassana  Aurivillius, 1899 (Tanzania, Malawi, Zambia: east of the Luangwa Valley)
P. p. obsoleta  Hawker-Smith, 1933 (Zimbabwe: Lomagundi district to the southern bank of the Zambezi River and the Victoria Falls, as well as Dichwe, Zambia)
P. p. ras  Talbot, 1935 (south-western Ethiopia)

References

Butterflies described in 1888
Poritiinae
Butterflies of Africa
Taxa named by Otto Staudinger